Santana is an American rock band, formed in 1966 by the Mexican American guitarist Carlos Santana, which has performed for five decades.

The group's first concert tours were North America, with performances in Europe, where they performed at small and medium-size venues and rock festivals. Following a lineup change in early 1972, they toured the world from 1972 to 1973. During this tour, the band performed at arenas and theaters, while doing several concerts in South America, one of the first tours of the continent by a major American rock act. After a North American tour in 1974, the last remaining members of the group from their famous lineup, Michael Shrieve and José Areas, quit the group, and the band underwent multiple lineup changes during the following years. In the 1970s to the 1980s, the band played at arenas, but mostly theaters and seldom music festivals.

In the 1990s, the group lost their recording contract, but they continued to tour extensively throughout the decade, mostly playing at theaters and amphitheaters. However, the band ended the decade with the Supernatural Tour, a vehicle for their popular 1999 album Supernatural. The 177–date tour was a success with audiences and critics, and the group continued to perform within the 2000s. In the third quarter of 2010, Carlos Santana proposed to drummer Cindy Blackman after her solo on the song "Corazón Espinado", and she became an official member of the band in 2016. The group continues to tour the world to this day.

Europe Tour '80 (1980) 

Santana Europe Tour '80 was a concert tour of Europe by American band Santana in 1980.

Tour band 
The tour band consisted of:

 Alex Ligertwood – lead vocals, rhythm guitar
 Carlos Santana – lead guitar, percussion, vocals
 Richard Baker – keyboards
 David Margen – bass guitar
 Graham Lear – drums
 Armando Peraza – congas, percussion, vocals
 Raul Rekow – congas, bongos, percussion, vocals
 Orestes Vilató – timbales, percussion

Set list 
This set list is representative of the show on July 1. It does not represent all concerts for the duration of the tour.

 "Hannibal" (Alex Ligertwood, Alan Pasqua, Raul Rekow, Carlos Santana)
 "All I Ever Wanted" (Ligertwood, Santana, Chris Solberg)
 "Tales of Kilimanjaro" (Pasqua, Armando Peraza, Rekow, Santana)
 "Black Magic Woman" (Peter Green)
 "Gypsy Queen" (Gábor Szabó)
 "Oye Como Va" (Tito Puente)
 "Just in Time to See the Sun" (Gregg Rolie, Santana, Michael Shrieve)
 "Incident at Neshabur" (Alberto Gianquinto, Santana)
 "Lightning in the Sky" (Santana, Solberg)
 "Aqua Marine" (Pasqua, Santana)
 "Savor" (José Areas, David Brown, Michael Carabello, Rolie, Santana, Shrieve)
 "Jin-go-lo-ba" (Babatunde Olatunji)
 "You Just Don't Care" (Areas, Brown, Carabello, Rolie, Santana, Shrieve)
 "Europa (Earth's Cry Heaven's Smile)" (Tom Coster, Santana)
 "Well All Right" (Norman Petty, Buddy Holly, Jerry Allison, Joe B. Mauldin) 
 "Runnin" (David Margen)
 "Soul Sacrifice" (Santana, Rolie, Brown, Marcus Malone)
 "Open Invitation" (Santana, Dennis Lambert, Brian Potter, Greg Walker, Margen)
 "Samba Pa Ti" (Santana)
 "She's Not There" (Rod Argent)
 "Transcendance" (Santana)
 "Shake Your Moneymaker" (Elmore James)
 "Evil Ways" (Clarence "Sonny" Henry)

Tour dates

Notes

US Tour 1980 (1980) 

Santana US Tour 1980 was a short concert tour of the United States by American rock band Santana.

Tour band 
The tour band consisted of:

 Alex Ligertwood – lead vocals, rhythm guitar
 Carlos Santana – lead guitar, percussion, vocals
 Richard Baker – keyboards
 David Margen – bass guitar
 Graham Lear – drums
 Armando Peraza – congas, percussion, vocals
 Raul Rekow – congas, bongos, percussion, vocals
 Orestes Vilató – timbales, percussion

Set list 
The tour lasted from July 30, 1980 at the Blossom Music Center in Cuyahoga Falls, Ohio to September 13, 1980 at the Hearst Greek Theatre in Berkeley, California. Taken from September 5, a common set list was as follows:

 "All I Ever Wanted" (Alex Ligertwood, Carlos Santana, Chris Solberg)
 "Incident at Neshabur" (Alberto Gianquinto, Santana)
 "Tales of Kilimanjaro" (Alan Pasqua, Armando Peraza, Raul Rekow, Santana)
 "Black Magic Woman" (Peter Green)
 "Gypsy Queen" (Gábor Szabó)
 "Lightning in the Sky" (Santana, Solberg)
 "Europa (Earth's Cry Heaven's Smile)" (Tom Coster, Santana)
 "Savor" (José Areas, David Brown, Michael Carabello, Gregg Rolie, Santana, Michael Shrieve)
 "Jin-go-lo-ba" (Babatunde Olatunji)
 "Well All Right" (Norman Petty, Buddy Holly, Jerry Allison, Joe B. Mauldin) 
 "Runnin" (Margen)
 "Soul Sacrifice" (Santana, Rolie, Brown, Marcus Malone)
 "Concierto de Aranjuez" (Joaquín Rodrigo)
 "Open Invitation" (Santana, Dennis Lambert, Brian Potter, Greg Walker, David Margen)
 "She's Not There" (Rod Argent)
 "Transcendance" (Santana)
 "Whole Lotta Love" (John Bonham, Willie Dixon, John Paul Jones, Jimmy Page, Robert Plant)
 "Evil Ways" (Clarence "Sonny" Henry)

Tour dates

Box office score data

Notes

Zebop! Tour (1981) 

The Zebop! Tour (also known as The Zebop Concert '81) was the sixteenth concert tour by Santana supporting the Zebop! album.

History 
Santana spent 1981 promoting Zebop! by touring in North America, Europe, and Asia. As well as playing at sporting venues and theaters, the group performed at nightclubs. The group started the year off with a huge 76-show tour of North America, followed by a brief tour of Japan with Masayoshi Takanaka. The band then flew to the United States to do seven concerts in California, and a tour of Europe soon followed. After the European tour concluded, the group opened for the Rolling Stones at the Pontiac Silverdome in Pontiac, Michigan in December.

During the Japanese tour, after visiting the Zōjō-ji temple in Tokyo, Carlos Santana's wife Deborah confessed to him that in early 1976, their guru Sri Chinmoy asked her to get an abortion. Carlos was saddened by this news, and they both parted ways with Chinmoy. Deborah's sister Kitsaun King also left the guru's path, and Dipti Nivas, a restaurant in San Francisco the Santanas helped create in September 1973, was sold.

Live releases 
Live material from 1981 has appeared on the following:

 The band's concert on July 4 at the Cape Cod Coliseum in South Yarmouth, Massachusetts was broadcast nationwide on radio and subsequently became a popular bootleg recording.
 "I Love You Much Too Much" from the show of August 12 at the Greek Theatre in Los Angeles was featured on the 1988 video Viva Santana! An Intimate Conversation With Carlos Santana.

Tour band 
 Alex Ligertwood – lead vocals, rhythm guitar
 Carlos Santana – lead guitar, percussion, vocals
 Richard Baker – keyboards
 David Margen – bass guitar
 Graham Lear – drums
 Armando Peraza – congas, percussion, vocals
 Raul Rekow – congas, bongos, percussion, vocals
 Orestes Vilató – timbales, percussion

Reception 
The concert on July 1 at Kleinhans Music Hall in Buffalo was given a positive review by Billboard.

Set list 
An average set list of this tour is as follows:

 "All I Ever Wanted" (Alex Ligertwood, Carlos Santana, Chris Solberg)
 "Primera Invasion" (Graham Lear, David Margen, Alan Pasqua, Santana)
 "Searchin'" (Ligertwood, Santana, Solberg)
 "Tales of Kilimanjaro" (Pasqua, Armando Peraza, Raul Rekow, Santana)
 "Black Magic Woman" (Peter Green)
 "Gypsy Queen" (Gábor Szabó)
 "Well All Right" (Norman Petty, Buddy Holly, Jerry Allison, Joe B. Mauldin)
 "E Papa Ré" (Santana, Richard Baker, Margen, Orestes Vilató, Ligertwood)
 "Europa (Earth's Cry Heaven's Smile)" (Tom Coster, Santana)
 "Savor" (José Areas, David Brown, Michael Carabello, Gregg Rolie, Santana, Michael Shrieve)
 "Jin-go-lo-ba" (Babatunde Olatunji)
 "Incident at Neshabur" (Alberto Gianquinto, Santana)
 "Body Surfing" (Santana, Ligertwood)
 "Soul Sacrifice" (Santana, Rolie, Brown, Marcus Malone)
 "Runnin" (Margen)
 "Open Invitation" (Santana, Dennis Lambert, Brian Potter, Greg Walker, Margen)
 "She's Not There" (Rod Argent)
 "The Sensitive Kind" (J.J. Cale)
 "American Gypsy" (Russ Ballard, Lear, Ligertwood)
 "Shake Your Moneymaker" (Elmore James)

Tour dates

North American leg (January 12 – July 11)

Japanese leg (August 2–7)

U.S. leg (August 11 – September 2)

European leg (September 11 – November 15)

U.S. show (December 1)

Box office score data

Notes

Shangó Tour (1982–1983) 

The Shangó Tour was the seventeenth concert tour by Santana supporting their album Shangó.

Live releases 
Live material from this tour has appeared on the following releases:

 "All I Ever Wanted", "Black Magic Woman" and "Gypsy Queen" from August 20, 1982 at the Altos de Chavón Amphitheater in La Romana, Dominican Republic were featured on the 1988 video Viva Santana! An Intimate Conversation With Carlos Santana.
 The band's entire concert on September 4, 1982 as a part of the US Festival was released in 2019 as Santana: Live at US Festival.
 "Black Magic Woman", "Gypsy Queen" and "Oye Como Va" on the 1988 compilation album Viva Santana! are from September 22, 1982 at the Montreal Forum in Montreal, Canada.
 "Abi Cama", "Vilató" and "Paris Finale" from April 18, 19 or 20, 1983, at Grande Nef de l'Île-des-Vannes in Saint-Ouen, France, also appear on Viva Santana!.

Tour band

1982 tour band 
 Alex Ligertwood – lead vocals, rhythm guitar
 Carlos Santana – lead guitar, percussion, vocals
 Richard Baker – keyboards
 David Margen – bass guitar
 Graham Lear – drums
 Armando Peraza – congas, percussion, vocals
 Raul Rekow – congas, bongos, percussion, vocals
 Orestes Vilató – timbales, percussion

1983 tour band 
 Greg Walker – lead vocals, percussion
 Carlos Santana – lead guitar, percussion, vocals
 Tom Coster – keyboards
 Chester D. Thompson – keyboards
 Keith Jones – bass guitar
 Graham Lear – drums
 Armando Peraza – congas, percussion, vocals
 Raul Rekow – congas, bongos, percussion, vocals
 Orestes Vilató – timbales, percussion

Typical set lists

May 1982—March 1983: North American tour 
Santana embarked on a 65-date North American tour through all of 1982 and a small part of 1983, beginning on May 29, 1982 at the Kabuki Night Club in San Francisco and ending on March 3, 1983 at the same venue. During this tour, the band headlined large music festivals such as the two-day Texxas Jam '82 (to a crowd of 64,945 and 65,000 fans each), Day on the Green (before a crowd of exactly 57,500 people), and Summerfest, appeared at the Concert for the Americas at the Altos de Chavón Amphitheater in La Romana, Dominican Republic, where their set was cut short due to rain, and opened for British rock band The Who on September 25, 1982 during their farewell tour, as documented by Billboard. An average set list for this outing is as follows:

 "Primera Invasion" (Graham Lear, David Margen, Alan Pasqua, Carlos Santana)
 "Searchin'" (Alex Ligertwood, Santana, Chris Solberg)
 "The Nile" (Santana, Ligertwood, Gregg Rolie)
 "Black Magic Woman" (Peter Green)
 "Gypsy Queen" (Gábor Szabó)
 "Oye Como Va" (Tito Puente)
 "Oxun (Oshūn)" (Santana, Ligertwood, Rolie, Lear, Armando Peraza, Raul Rekow, Orestes Vilató)
 "Well All Right" (Norman Petty, Buddy Holly, Jerry Allison, Joe B. Mauldin) 
 "Incident at Neshabur" (Alberto Gianquinto, Santana)
 "Nowhere to Run" (Russ Ballard)
 "Savor" (José Areas, David Brown, Michael Carabello, Rolie, Santana, Michael Shrieve)
 "Body Surfing" (Santana, Ligertwood)
 "Jin-go-lo-ba" (Babatunde Olatunji)
 "Hold On" (Ian Thomas)
 "Open Invitation" (Santana, Dennis Lambert, Brian Potter, Greg Walker, Margen)
 "She's Not There" (Rod Argent)
 "American Gypsy" (Ballard, Lear, Ligertwood)
 "Europa (Earth's Cry Heaven's Smile)" (Tom Coster, Santana)
 "Shangó" (Rekow, Vilató, Peraza)

March—May 1983: European tour 
The European tour lasted from March 11, 1983 at the Carl-Diem-Halle in Würzburg, West Germany to May 13, 1983 at Budapest Sportcsarnok in Budapest, Hungary. This set list is representative of the show on April 26. It does not represent all concerts for the duration of the tour.

 "Nowhere to Run" (Ballard)
 "Hold On" (Thomas)
 "Tales of Kilimanjaro" (Pasqua, Peraza, Rekow, Santana)
 "Black Magic Woman" (Green)
 "Gypsy Queen" (Szabó)
 "Oye Como Va" (Puente)
 "Incident at Neshabur" (Gianquinto, Santana)
 "Watch Your Step" (Ricky Lee Phelps, Doug Phelps)
 "Aqua Marine" (Pasqua, Santana)
 "Brotherhood" (David Sancious, Santana, Chester D. Thompson)
 "That's the Way God Planned It" (Billy Preston)
 "Savor" (Areas, Brown, Carabello, Rolie, Santana, Shrieve)
 "Jin-go-lo-ba" (Olatunji)
 "Havana Moon" (Chuck Berry)
 "Soul Sacrifice" (Santana, Rolie, Brown, Marcus Malone)
 "Concierto de Aranjuez" (Joaquín Rodrigo)
 "Open Invitation" (Santana, Lambert, Potter, Walker, Margen)
 "She's Not There" (Argent)
 "Marbles" (John McLaughlin)
 "American Gypsy" (Ballard, Lear, Ligertwood)
 "Europa (Earth's Cry Heaven's Smile)" (Coster, Santana)
 "Shangó" (Rekow, Vilató, Peraza)
 "Super Boogie"
 "Shake Your Moneymaker" (Elmore James)

Tour dates

North American leg (May 29, 1982 – March 3, 1983)

European leg (March 11, 1983 – May 13, 1983)

Box office score data

Notes

Havana Moon Tour (1983) 

The Havana Moon Tour was the eighteenth concert tour by Santana in 1983, supporting leader Carlos Santana's solo album Havana Moon.

Tour band 
 Greg Walker – lead vocals, percussion
 Carlos Santana – guitar, percussion, vocals
 Tom Coster – keyboards
 Chester D. Thompson – keyboards
 Keith Jones – bass guitar
 Graham Lear – drums
 Armando Peraza – congas, percussion
 Raul Rekow – congas, bongos, percussion, backing vocals
 Orestes Vilató – timbales, percussion

Typical set lists

Japan and Hong Kong 
Santana did an Asian tour from July 3 at the Yokohama Cultural Gymnasium in Yokohama, Japan to July 19 at Queen Elizabeth Stadium in Wan Chai, Hong Kong. A typical set list is from July 19:

 "Batuka" (José Areas, David Brown, Michael Carabello, Gregg Rolie, Michael Shrieve)
 "No One to Depend On" (Carabello, Coke Escovedo, Rolie, Willie Bobo, Melvin Lastie)
 "Taboo" (Areas, Rolie)
 "Hold On" (Ian Thomas)
 "Tales of Kilimanjaro" (Alan Pasqua, Armando Peraza, Raul Rekow, Carlos Santana)
 "Black Magic Woman" (Peter Green)
 "Gypsy Queen" (Gábor Szabó)
 "Oye Como Va" (Tito Puente)
 "Incident at Neshabur" (Alberto Gianquinto, Santana)
 "Waited All My Life"
 "Aqua Marine" (Pasqua, Santana)
 "Savor" (Areas, Brown, Carabello, Rolie, Santana, Shrieve)
 "Jin-go-lo-ba" (Babatunde Olatunji)

Australia 
The band did two shows in Australia on July 23 at Sydney Entertainment Centre in Sydney and July 24 at Melbourne Sports and Entertainment Centre in Melbourne. Sourced from a bootleg recording, the most complete set list is from Melbourne:

 "Concierto de Aranjuez" (Joaquín Rodrigo)
 "Soul Sacrifice" (Santana, Rolie, Brown, Marcus Malone)
 "Batuka" (Areas, Brown, Carabello, Rolie, Shrieve)
 "No One to Depend On" (Carabello, Escovedo, Rolie, Bobo, Lastie)
 "Taboo" (Areas, Rolie)
 "Gypsy Queen" (Szabó)
 "Savor" (Areas, Brown, Carabello, Rolie, Santana, Shrieve)
 "Jin-go-lo-ba" (Olatunji)
 "Havana Moon" (Chuck Berry)
 "Toussaint L'Overture" (Areas, Brown, Carabello, Rolie, Santana, Shrieve)
 "Incident at Neshabur" (Gianquinto, Santana)
 "Open Invitation" (Santana, Lambert, Potter, Greg Walker, David Margen)
 "She's Not There" (Rod Argent)
 "Right Now" (Alex Ligertwood, Santana)
 "Shangó" (Rekow, Orestes Vilató, Peraza)
 "Super Boogie"
 "Hong Kong Blues"
 "John Henry" (traditional)
 "Shake Your Moneymaker" (Elmore James)
 "Hold On" (Thomas)
 "Europa (Earth's Cry Heaven's Smile)" (Tom Coster, Santana)

US and Canada 
A North American tour lasted from July 29 at Neal S. Blaisdell Center Arena in Honolulu, Hawaii to October 21 at the Caesars Tahoe casino in Stateline, Nevada. A typical set list is from October 6 at the Universal Amphitheatre in Los Angeles, California:

 "Batuka" (Areas, Brown, Carabello, Rolie, Shrieve)
 "No One to Depend On" (Carabello, Escovedo, Rolie, Bobo, Lastie)
 "Taboo" (Areas, Rolie)
 "Hold On" (Thomas)
 "Tales of Kilimanjaro" (Pasqua, Peraza, Rekow, Santana)
 "Black Magic Woman" (Green)
 "Gypsy Queen" (Szabó)
 "Incident at Neshabur" (Gianquinto, Santana)
 "Waited All My Life"
 "Aqua Marine" (Pasqua, Santana)
 "Brotherhood" (David Sancious, Santana, Chester D. Thompson)
 "Savor" (Areas, Brown, Carabello, Rolie, Santana, Shrieve)
 "Jin-go-lo-ba" (Olatunji)
 "Havana Moon" (Berry)
 "Soul Sacrifice" (Santana, Rolie, Brown, Malone)
 "Concierto de Aranjuez" (Rodrigo)
 "Open Invitation" (Santana, Lambert, Potter, Walker, Margen)
 "She's Not There" (Argent)
 "Right Now" (Ligertwood, Santana)
 "Europa (Earth's Cry Heaven's Smile)" (Coster, Santana)
 "Shangó" (Rekow, Vilató, Peraza)
 "In a Silent Way" (Joe Zawinul, Miles Davis)
 "Dealer" (Jim Capaldi)
 "Super Boogie"
 "Hong Kong Blues"
 "Shake Your Moneymaker" (James)

Tour dates 
The tour itinerary consisted of:

Asian leg (July 3–19)

Australian leg (July 23–24)

North American leg (July 29 – October 21)

Box office score data

Bob Dylan/Santana European Tour 1984 (1984) 

From May 28 to July 8, 1984, Bob Dylan and Santana set out on a twenty-seven date European tour.

Beyond Appearances Tour (1984–1986) 

The Beyond Appearances Tour was the twentieth concert tour by American rock band Santana from 1984 to 1986.

Live releases 
Live material from this tour has appeared on the following releases:

 "Super Boogie" and "Hong Kong Blues" on the 1988 compilation album Viva Santana! are from July 14, 1985 at the Agora Ballroom in West Hartford, Connecticut.
 "Open Invitation" and "She's Not There" from the second show on August 9, 1985 at the Warfield Theatre in San Francisco were also featured on Viva Santana!.
 "She's Not There" and "Savor" from the same show at the Warfield were released on the 1988 video Viva Santana! An Intimate Conversation With Carlos Santana.

Tour band 
 Alex Ligertwood – lead vocals, rhythm guitar (through May 1986)
 Buddy Miles – lead vocals (beginning May 1986)
 Carlos Santana – lead guitar, percussion, vocals
 Chester D. Thompson – keyboards
 Sterling Crew – keyboards (from April 1985 to May 1986)
 Tom Coster – keyboards (beginning May 1986)
 Alphonso Johnson – bass guitar
 Greg Walker – lead vocals, percussion (through May 1986)
 Graham Lear – drums
 Raul Rekow – congas, bongos, percussion, backing vocals
 Armando Peraza – congas, percussion
 Orestes Vilató – timbales, percussion

Reception 
The concerts on October 31, 1984 at The Ritz in New York City were given a positive review by Billboard. The band's set at the Crack Down! concert in Madison Square Garden on October 31, 1986 was given a mostly positive review. In a review for The New York Times, Jon Pareles said that the band's new vocalist, Buddy Miles, "did not do much with the songs, but he delivered an impassioned version of his own 'Them Changes'." He also added that the band "worked up a percussive momentum during instrumental sections, particularly the climactic 'Black Magic Woman'".

Set list

Tour dates

North American leg (October 6, 1984 – May 24, 1986)

Japanese show (June 1, 1986)

Australian leg (June 5–9, 1986)

North American leg (June 12 – November 1, 1986)

Box office score data

Notes

Freedom Tour (1987) 

The Freedom Tour (also known as The Freedom Concert '87 or The Freedom Concert 1987) was the twenty-first concert tour by Santana, supporting their album Freedom.

History 
In 1987, Santana did a long world tour promoting Freedom, their tenth international tour since 1970. Aside from visiting countries they have never visited before, such as East Berlin, the band did two shows in war-torn Israel on April 29 and 30. The concert at the Sultan's Pool in Jerusalem on the 29th attracted at least 10,000 Jewish and Arab fans. Lead guitarist Carlos Santana's highlight of the tour was on July 4 at the Izmailovo Stadium in Moscow, Russia, where the band, alongside James Taylor, the Doobie Brothers, Bonnie Raitt and more, played to more than 25,000 Russians, the band's first show in Russia.

On the night of September 11, 1987 at the Sunrise Musical Theater in Sunrise, Florida, bass player Jaco Pastorius sneaked onstage before being kicked out by the theater's security team. He then made his way to the Midnight Bottle Club in Wilton Manors, Florida, where he ended up in a fight with Luc Havan, the club's manager, after reportedly kicking in a glass door, having been refused entry to the club. As a result of his injuries, he died on September 21, 1987 at the age of 35 at Broward General Medical Center in Fort Lauderdale.

Live releases 
Live material from 1987 has appeared on the following releases:

 Crowd shots from the concert on July 4 at the Izmailovo Stadium in Moscow were used for the 1988 video Viva Santana! An Intimate Conversation With Carlos Santana.

Tour band 
 Alex Ligertwood – lead vocals, rhythm guitar
 Buddy Miles – lead vocals (through July)
 Carlos Santana – lead guitar, percussion, vocals
 Chester D. Thompson – keyboards
 Alphonso Johnson – bass guitar
 Graham Lear – drums
 Raul Rekow – congas, bongos, percussion, backing vocals
 Armando Peraza – congas, percussion
 Orestes Vilató – timbales, percussion

Set list 

A typical set list of this tour was as follows (a song not followed by the writer indicates that the writer of the song is unknown):

 "The Beat of My Drum" (Babatunde Olatunji)
 "Veracruz" (Jeffrey Cohen, Buddy Miles, Gregg Rolie, Carlos Santana)
 "Primera Invasion" (Graham Lear, David Margen, Alan Pasqua, Santana)
 "Open Invitation" (Santana, Dennis Lambert, Brian Potter, Greg Walker, Margen)
 "She's Not There" (Rod Argent)
 "One"
 "Incident at Neshabur" (Alberto Gianquinto, Santana)
 "Body Surfing" (Santana, Alex Ligertwood)
 "Songs of Freedom" (Tom Coster, Miles, Santana)
 "Savor" (José Areas, David Brown, Michael Carabello, Rolie, Santana, Michael Shrieve)
 "Cavatina" (Stanley Myers)
 "Black Magic Woman" (Peter Green)
 "Gypsy Queen" (Gábor Szabó)
 "Oye Como Va" (Tito Puente)
 "Evil Ways" (Clarence "Sonny" Henry)
 "Jin-go-lo-ba" (Babatunde Olatunji)
 "Once It's Gotcha" (Cohen, Coster, Alphonso Johnson)
Encore
 "The Healer" (John Lee Hooker, Roy Rogers, Santana, Chester Thompson)
 "By the Pool"
 "Europa (Earth's Cry Heaven's Smile)" (Coster, Santana)
 "Right Now" (Ligertwood, Santana)
Second Encore
 "Soul Sacrifice" (Santana, Rolie, Brown, Marcus Malone)
 "Deeper, Dig Deeper" (Sterling Crew, Miles, Santana, Thompson)

Tour dates 
The tour itinerary consisted of:

North American show (February 14)

European leg (March 5 – April 26)

Israeli leg (April 29–30)

European leg (May 2–24)

U.S. leg (June 13 – July 1)

Russian show (July 4)

North American leg (July 8 – September 12)

Box office score data

Notes

Blues for Salvador Tour (1988) 

The Blues for Salvador Tour was the twenty-second concert tour by Santana in 1988, supporting leader Carlos Santana's 1987 solo album Blues for Salvador.

Tour band 
Known as "the Promise Band", the tour band was:

 Carlos Santana – guitar, percussion, vocals
 Chester D. Thompson – keyboards, vocals
 Alphonso Johnson – bass guitar
 Leon "Ndugu" Chancler – drums
 José Areas – timbales, congas, percussion
 Armando Peraza – percussion, vocals

Set list 
The tour lasted from April 29, 1988 at the Orpheum in Vancouver, Canada to May 17, 1988 at the Celebrity Theatre in Phoenix, Arizona. An average set list of this tour was as follows:

 "Bailando/Aquatic Park" (Carlos Santana, Chester D. Thompson, Orestes Vilató)
 "Bella" (Sterling Crew, Santana, Thompson)
 "Smooth Criminal" (Michael Jackson)
 "The Healer" (John Lee Hooker, Roy Rogers, Santana, Chester Thompson)
 "Wayne I" (Wayne Shorter)
 "Super Boogie"
 "Hong Kong Blues" (Hoagy Carmichael)
 "Wonderful Combination"
 "Savor" (José Areas, David Brown, Michael Carabello, Gregg Rolie, Santana, Michael Shrieve)
 "Goodness and Mercy" (Santana, Thompson)
 "'Trane" (Santana)
 "Cavatina" (Stanley Myers)
 "Cloud Nine" (Norman Whitfield, Barrett Strong)
 "Blues for Salvador" (Santana, Thompson)
Encore
 "Mandela" (Armando Peraza)
 "Tryin' Again" (Leon "Ndugu" Chancler)
 "Hannibal" (Alex Ligertwood, Alan Pasqua, Raul Rekow)
 "Europa (Earth's Cry Heaven's Smile)" (Tom Coster, Santana)
 "Deeper, Dig Deeper" (Crew, Buddy Miles, Santana, Thompson)

Tour dates

Box office score data

Notes

Viva Santana! Tour (1988–1989) 

The Viva Santana! Tour was the twenty-third concert tour by American rock band Santana, supporting the Viva Santana! compilation album. Most of this tour was a reunion tour of sorts, as organist and lead vocalist Gregg Rolie, percussionist José Areas, and drummer Michael Shrieve accompanied the group for some performances.

Live releases 
Live material from this tour has appeared on the following releases:

 "Blues for Salvador" from the show on September 17, 1988 at Blossom Music Center in Cuyahoga Falls, Ohio was featured on the 1988 video Viva Santana! An Intimate Conversation With Carlos Santana.

Tour band 
 Gregg Rolie – lead vocals, organ, keyboards (through April 1989)
 Alex Ligertwood – lead vocals, rhythm guitar (beginning April 1989)
 Carlos Santana – lead guitar, percussion, vocals
 Chester D. Thompson – keyboards, vocals
 Alphonso Johnson – bass guitar (through September 1989)
 Keith Jones – bass guitar (beginning September 1989)
 Michael Shrieve – drums (through April 1989)
 Walfredo Reyes Jr. – drums (beginning April 1989)
 José Areas – timbales, congas, percussion (through September 1989)
 Armando Peraza – congas, percussion, vocals

Set list 
A typical set list of this tour was as follows:

 "Mandela" (Armando Peraza)
 "Batuka" (José Areas, David Brown, Michael Carabello, Gregg Rolie, Michael Shrieve)
 "No One to Depend On" (Carabello, Coke Escovedo, Rolie, Willie Bobo, Melvin Lastie)
 "For Those Who Chant" (Luis Gasca)
 "The Healer" (John Lee Hooker, Roy Rogers, Carlos Santana, Chester Thompson)
 "Smooth Criminal" (Michael Jackson)
 "Taboo" (Areas, Rolie)
 "Black Magic Woman" (Peter Green)
 "Gypsy Queen" (Gábor Szabó)
 "Oye Como Va" (Tito Puente)
 "Se Acabó" (Areas)
 "Incident at Neshabur" (Alberto Gianquinto, Santana)
 "Savor" (Areas, Brown, Carabello, Rolie, Santana, Shrieve)
 "Goodness and Mercy" (Santana, Thompson)
 "Europa (Earth's Cry Heaven's Smile)" (Tom Coster, Santana)
 "Everybody's Everything" (Santana, Milton Brown, Tyrone Moss)
 "Cavatina" (Stanley Myers)
 "Toussaint L'Overture" (Areas, Brown, Carabello, Rolie, Shrieve, Santana)
 "Once It's Gotcha" (Jeffrey Cohen, Coster, Alphonso Johnson)

Encore
 "Soul Sacrifice" (Santana, Rolie, Brown, Marcus Malone)

Second Encore
 "Deeper, Dig Deeper" (Sterling Crew, Buddy Miles, Santana, Thompson)

Tour dates 
The tour dates were as follows:

North American leg (August 26, 1988 – April 29, 1989)

European leg (May 3 – July 27, 1989)

U.S. leg (September 1 – November 26, 1989)

Box office score data

Notes

References 
Citations

Bibliography

External links 

1980s
1980s-related lists
Lists of concert tours